Aventina may refer to:

Aventina (given name), Russian female first name
Aventina (moth), a synonym of the moth genus Corgatha of the family Noctuidae